The Express I was a steam ship that was built in 1900, as the Express, for the Waxholmsbolaget. She remained on that company's Stockholm archipelago passenger ferry services for her working life, being renamed Express I in 1913, laid up in 1956 and scrapped in 1961.

History
She was delivered in 1900 to Waxholms Ångfartygs AB, better known as the Waxholmsbolaget, and initially used on that company's route from Stockholm to Vaxholm. In 1913 she was renamed Express I, at the same time as the company introduced the Express II. After the end of the summer season in 1956 she was laid up, and in 1961 she was scrapped.

References

Ships built in Stockholm
Steamships of Sweden
1900 ships